Vladimir Andreyevich Moskvichyov (born 2 March 2000) is a Russian professional footballer who plays as a defensive midfielder for FC Neftekhimik Nizhnekamsk on loan from FC Dynamo Moscow.

Club career
He made his debut for the first team of Dynamo Moscow on 26 September 2018 in a Russian Cup game against Torpedo Moscow.

He made his Russian Premier League debut for Dynamo on 21 October 2018 in a game against Zenit Saint Petersburg.

On 21 August 2019, he joined FC Orenburg on loan. The loan was terminated in January 2020.

Career statistics

References

External links
 
 

2000 births
Footballers from Moscow
Living people
Russian footballers
Russia youth international footballers
Association football midfielders
FC Dynamo Moscow players
FC Orenburg players
FC Neftekhimik Nizhnekamsk players
Russian Premier League players
Russian First League players
Russian Second League players